"Waterfalls" is a song by Nigerian-born Australian singer-songwriter and dancer Timomatic. It was released as a digital download in Australia on 13 September 2013. The song peaked at number 26 on the Australian Singles Chart.

Track listings

Charts

Weekly charts

Year-end charts

The Rain Remixes

On 11 October, Timomatic released a 6-track EP titled The Rain Remixes, which included five versions of "Waterfalls" and one of "Parachute".

Track listing
 "Waterfalls"
 "Waterfalls" (Kid Massive Remix)
 "Waterfalls" (Katt Niall Remix)
 "Waterfalls" (Jam XpressRemix)
 "Waterfalls" (Red Rocket Orange Remix)
 "Parachute" (Stevie Mink Remix)

Release history

References

2013 songs
2013 singles
Timomatic songs
Songs written by Arnthor Birgisson
Sony Music Australia singles